Yanchukan is an urban locality (an urban-type settlement) in Severo-Baykalsky District of the Republic of Buryatia, Russia. As of the 2010 Census, its population was 392.

History
Urban-type settlement status was granted to Yanchukan in 1982.

Administrative and municipal status
Within the framework of administrative divisions, the urban-type settlement (inhabited locality) of Yanchukan is incorporated within Severo-Baykalsky District as Yanchukan Urban-Type Settlement (an administrative division of the district). As a municipal division, Yanchukan Urban-Type Settlement is incorporated within Severo-Baykalsky Municipal District as Yanchukan Urban Settlement.

References

Notes

Sources

Urban-type settlements in Buryatia
Populated places in Severo-Baykalsky District